Dhola, Nepal is a village development committee in Dhading District in the Bagmati Zone of central Nepal. It is  situated high up the Himalayas in the Annapurna and Manaslu  Mountain range in the mid-western Nepal  at an altitude of 1210 m above the sea level. At the time of the 2011 Nepal census it had a population of 4,033 and had 998 houses in it. Where total population of Male and Female are 1,772 and 2,261 respectively.

References

Populated places in Dhading District